Senator Hassan may refer to:

United States
Members of the U.S. Senate:
Maggie Hassan (1958–), senator from New Hampshire (2017–)

France
Members of the French Senate:
Hassan Gouled Aptidon (1916–2006), senator (1952–1958)